Intersex people are born with sex characteristics (such as genitals, gonads, and chromosome patterns) that "do not fit the typical definitions for male or female bodies". They are substantially more likely to identify as lesbian, gay, bisexual, or transgender (LGBT) than the non-intersex population, with an estimated 52% identifying as non-heterosexual and 8.5% to 20% experiencing gender dysphoria. Although many intersex people are heterosexual and cisgender, this overlap and "shared experiences of harm arising from dominant societal sex and gender norms" has led to intersex people often being included under the LGBT umbrella, with the acronym sometimes expanded to LGBTI. Some intersex activists and organisations have criticised this inclusion as distracting from intersex-specific issues such as involuntary medical interventions.

Intersex and homosexuality 

Intersex can be contrasted with homosexuality or same-sex attraction. Numerous studies have shown higher rates of same sex attraction in intersex people, with a recent Australian study of people born with atypical sex characteristics finding that 52% of respondents were non-heterosexual.

Clinical research on intersex subjects has been used to investigate means of preventing homosexuality. In 1990, Heino Meyer-Bahlburg wrote on a "prenatal hormone theory of sexual orientation." The author discussed research finding higher rates of same sex attraction among women with congenital adrenal hyperplasia, and consistent sexual attraction to men among women with complete androgen insensitivity syndrome - a population described by the author as "genetic males." Meyer-Bahlburg also discussed sexual attraction by individuals with partial androgen insensitivity syndrome, 5α-Reductase deficiency and 17β-Hydroxysteroid dehydrogenase III deficiency, stating that sexual attraction towards females in individuals with these conditions was facilitated by "prenatal exposure to and utilization of androgens." He concluded:

In 2010, Saroj Nimkarn and Maria New wrote that, "Gender-related behaviors, namely childhood play, peer association, career and leisure time preferences in adolescence and adulthood, maternalism, aggression, and sexual orientation become" masculinized in women with congenital adrenal hyperplasia. Medical intervention to prevent such traits has been likened by Dreger, Feder and Tamar-Mattis to a means of preventing homosexuality and "uppity women."

Queer bodies 

Intersex activists and scholars such as Morgan Holmes, Katrina Karkazis and Morgan Carpenter have identified heteronormativity in medical rationales for medical interventions on infants and children with intersex characteristics. Holmes and Carpenter have sometimes talked of intersex bodies as "queer bodies", while Carpenter also stresses inadequacies and "dangerous" consequences from framing intersex as a sexual orientation or gender identity issue.

In What Can Queer Theory Do for Intersex? Iain Morland contrasts queer "hedonic activism" with an experience of insensate post-surgical intersex bodies to claim that "queerness is characterized by the sensory interrelation of pleasure and shame."

Intersex and transgender 

Intersex can also be contrasted with transgender, which describes the condition in which one's gender identity does not match one's assigned sex. Some people are both intersex and transgender. A 2012 clinical review paper found that between 8.5% and 20% of people with intersex variations experienced gender dysphoria.

Non-binary gender 

Recognition of third sex or gender classifications occurs in several countries. Sociological research in Australia, a country with a third 'X' sex classification, shows that 19% of people born with atypical sex characteristics selected an "X" or "other" option, while 52% are women, 23% men, and 6% unsure.

A German law requiring that infants which can be assigned to neither sex have their status left blank on their birth certificate was criticised by intersex rights groups on the basis that it could encourage parents who see a neutral option as undesirable to have their child undergo genital surgery. In 2013, the third International Intersex Forum made statements for the first time on sex and gender registration in the Malta declaration, advocating for "register[ing] intersex children as females or males, with the awareness that, like all people, they may grow up to identify with a different sex or gender" and "ensur[ing] that sex or gender classifications are amendable through a simple administrative procedure at the request of the individuals concerned." It also advocates for non-binary options and self-identification for all while calling for an end to registering sex on birth certificates.

Alex MacFarlane is believed to be the first person in Australia to obtain a birth certificate recording sex as indeterminate, and the first Australian passport with an 'X' sex marker in 2003. On September 26, 2016, California resident Sara Kelly Keenan became the second person in the United States (after Elisa Rae Shupe) to legally change their gender to 'non-binary'. Keenan cited Shupe's case as inspiration for their petition, "It never occurred to me that this was an option, because I thought the gender change laws were strictly for transgender people. I decided to try and use the same framework to have a third gender." Keenan later obtained a birth certificate with an intersex sex marker. In press reporting of this decision, it became apparent that Ohio had issued a 'hermaphrodite' sex marker in 2012.

Intersex scholar Morgan Holmes argues that thinking of societies that incorporate a 'third sex' as superior is overly simplistic, and that "to understand whether a system is more or less oppressive than another we have to understand how it treats its various members, not only its 'thirds'."

The Asia Pacific Forum of National Human Rights Institutions states that the legal recognition of intersex people is firstly about access to the same rights as other men and women, when assigned male or female; secondly it is about access to administrative corrections to legal documents when an original sex assignment is not appropriate; and thirdly it is not about the creation of a third sex or gender classification for intersex people as a population but it is, instead, about self-determination.

LGBT and LGBTI 

The relationship of intersex to lesbian, gay, bisexual and trans, and queer communities is complex, but intersex people are often added to LGBT to create an LGBTI community. A 2019 background note by the Office of the United Nations High Commissioner for Human Rights has stated that intersex persons are a distinct population with concerns about "representation, misrepresentation and resourcing", but who share "common concerns" with LGBT people "due to shared experiences of harm arising from dominant societal sex and gender norms." The paper identifies both how intersex people can suffer human rights violations "before they are able to develop or freely express and identity" and how "stereotypes, fear and stigmatization of LGBT people provide rationales for forced and coercive medical interventions on children with intersex variations."

Julius Kaggwa of SIPD Uganda has written that, while the gay community "offers us a place of relative safety, it is also oblivious to our specific needs." Mauro Cabral has written that transgender people and organizations "need to stop approaching intersex issues as if they were trans issues" including use of intersex as a means of explaining being transgender; "we can collaborate a lot with the intersex movement by making it clear how wrong that approach is."

Pidgeon Pagonis states that adding an I to LGBTQA may or may not help increase representation, and may increase funding opportunities for intersex organizations, but may also be harmful to intersex children due to stigma associated with being LGBTQA. Organisation Intersex International Australia states that some intersex individuals are same sex attracted, and some are heterosexual, but "LGBTI activism has fought for the rights of people who fall outside of expected binary sex and gender norms."

On July 1, 2020 Russian intersex organizations (Interseks.ru, ARSI, NFP+, Intersex Russia) issued a statement on the use of LGBTI abbreviation urging not to use it in and about countries with widespread prejudice and violence in attitudes of individuals based on their sexual orientation and gender identity.

Protecting intersex people in law 

Emi Koyama describes how inclusion of intersex in LGBTI can fail to address intersex-specific human rights issues, including creating false impressions "that intersex people's rights are protected" by laws protecting LGBT people, and failing to acknowledge that many intersex people are not LGBT.

South Africa protects intersex people from discrimination as part of a prohibition of discrimination on grounds of sex. Organisation Intersex International Australia successfully lobbied for inclusion of a legal attribute of "intersex status" in anti-discrimination law, stating that protection on grounds of sexual orientation and gender identity was insufficient. Following 2015 legislation in Malta, an attribute of sex characteristics is now more widespread.

"Pinkwashing" 

Multiple organizations have highlighted appeals to LGBT rights recognition that fail to address the issue of unnecessary "normalising" intersex medical interventions on intersex children, including by using the portmanteau pinkwashing. In a 2001 paper for the (now defunct) Intersex Society of North America, Emi Koyama and Lisa Weasel stating that teaching of intersex issues is "stuck" at talking about intersex as a mean instead of an end:

In June 2016, Organisation Intersex International Australia pointed to contradictory statements by Australian governments, suggesting that the dignity and rights of LGBT and intersex people are recognized while, at the same time, harmful practices on intersex children continue.

In August 2016, Zwischengeschlecht described actions to promote equality or civil status legislation without action on banning "intersex genital mutilations" as a form of pinkwashing. The organization has previously highlighted evasive government statements to UN Treaty Bodies that conflate intersex, transgender and LGBT issues, instead of addressing harmful practices on infants.

Terms 
LGBT+ is an initialism that stands for lesbian, gay, bisexual, and transgender, and others. The initialism has become mainstream as a self-designation; it has been adopted by the majority of sexuality and gender identity-based community centers and media in the United States, as well as many other countries.

Another variant is LGBTQIA, which is used, for example, by the "Lesbian, Gay, Bisexual, Transgender, Queer, Intersex, Asexual Resource Center" at the University of California, Davis.

The United States National Institutes of Health (NIH) have framed LGBT, others "whose sexual orientation and/or gender identity varies, those who may not self-identify as LGBT" and also intersex populations (as persons with disorders of sex development) as "sexual and gender minority" (SGM) populations. This has led to the development of an NIH SGM Health Research Strategic Plan.

Other intersectionalities

Intersex and children's rights 

Kimberly Zieselman of interACT has described how the LGBT community has helped open doors, but how intersex rights are broader: "at its core this is a children’s rights issue. It is also about health and reproductive rights, because these operations can lead to infertility."

Intersex and disability 

Multiple authors and civil society organizations highlight intersectionalities between intersex people and disability, due to issues of medicalization, and the use of preimplantation genetic diagnosis. In an analysis of the use of preimplantation genetic diagnosis to eliminate intersex traits, Behrmann and Ravitsky state: "Parental choice against intersex may ... conceal biases against same-sex attractedness and gender nonconformity."

A 2006 clinical reframing of intersex conditions as disorders of sex development made associations between intersex and disability explicit, but the rhetorical shift remains deeply contentious. Sociological research in Australia, published in 2016, found that 3% of respondents used the term "disorders of sex development" or "DSD" to define their sex characteristics, while 21% use the term when accessing medical services. In contrast, 60% used the term "intersex" in some form to self-describe their sex characteristics.

In the United States, intersex persons are protected by the Americans with Disabilities Act. In 2013, the Australian Senate published a report on the Involuntary or coerced sterilisation of intersex people in Australia as part of a broader inquiry into the involuntary or coercive sterilization of people with disabilities. In Europe, OII Europe has identified multiple articles of the UN Convention on the Rights of Persons with Disabilities, including on equality and non-discrimination, and freedom from torture, and protecting the integrity of the person. Nevertheless, the organization has expressed concern that framings of intersex as disability can reinforce medicalization and lack of human rights, and do not match self-identification.

Notes

References

Intersex in society
Intersex rights
LGBT